Rend Collective (formerly known as Rend Collective Experiment) is a Northern Irish Christian folk rock worship band originating from Bangor, Northern Ireland.  The current lineup consists of Gareth Gilkeson, Chris Llewellyn, Ali Gilkeson, Patrick Thompson and Steve Mitchell. Their first studio album Organic Family Hymnal was released on 28 September 2010. Their second studio album Homemade Worship by Handmade People was released on 10 January 2012. Both records were released by Kingsway. Their first live album Campfire was released on 29 January 2013 with Integrity. Their fourth album, The Art of Celebration, was released on 17 March 2014. Their fifth album, Campfire Christmas, Vol. 1 was released in November 2014, and the sixth, As Family We Go, on 21 August 2015. Their second live album, Campfire II: Simplicity, was released at the beginning of October 2016. In 2017 they released the Build Your Kingdom Here (A Rend Collective Mix Tape) compilation followed by Good News in early 2018.

Background

The band was established under the name of Rend Collective Experiment between 2002-2003 during a point which drummer Gareth Gilkeson described as "a bunch of us trying to figure out life. Before the formation, most of the members were part of the "Rend" young adults ministry at Bangor Elim Church to where Gilkeson preached and Llewellyn lead worship." While the group comprises over 15 members, the band tours and records with 6 members. The remaining members are there for support and to encourage the band "spiritually, musically, and missionally." They explained noticing a sense of hostility from the modern culture towards the church and Christians therefore sought to create music that would draw such individuals spiritually and encourage them to come back to church.

Rend Collective was on the And If Our God Is for Us... Tour with Chris Tomlin and Christy Nockels in the Spring of 2011. They toured with Kari Jobe on the Majestic Tour.

In 2014, Rend Collective toured with the RESET Movement, as part of their musical ministry involving Lacey Sturm (formerly of Flyleaf); spoken-word artist Propaganda; worship leader Dave Lubben; DJ Efechto; International House of Prayer worship artist Matt Gilman; and singer/songwriter Morgan Harper Nichols.

Music 

Campfire includes live, outdoor recordings of songs previously released on Organic Family Hymnal and Homemade Worship by Handmade People. The audience for the recording were crowd-sourced using Facebook and Twitter. Their third studio album, The Art of Celebration, was released on 17 March 2014. Their fourth studio album, Campfire Christmas (Vol. 1), released 19 November 2014. Their fifth studio album, As Family We Go, was released on 21 August 2015. Their second live album, Campfire II: Simplicity, was released at the beginning of October 2016.

Rend Family Records
Their first signee to the label is Urban Rescue, from Los Angeles, California.

Members 
Current
 Gareth Gilkeson – drums, percussion, band leader (2007–present)
 Chris Llewellyn – lead vocals, acoustic guitar, ukulele (2007–present)
 Ali Gilkeson – keyboards, female lead/backing vocals, auxiliary percussion (2007–present)
 Patrick Thompson – electric guitar, banjo, various strings, backing vocals (2007–present), bass guitar (2007–2013)
 Steve Mitchell – bass guitar, dobro, piano (2013–present)
Wil Pearce - electric guitar, mandolin, banjo, backing vocals (2020-present)
 Thomas Ewing - electric guitar, mandolin, harmonica, backing vocals, violin (2021-present)

Former
 Will Herron – lead vocals, acoustic guitar, multi-instrumentalist
 Bridget Herron – female lead and backing vocals
 Bobby Russell – bass guitar, piano (2012–2013)
 Larry Lease – backup vocals (2015–2016)

Discography

Albums

Mixtapes

Singles

Awards and nominations 

!
|-
| 2018
| Good News
| Worship Album of the Year
| 
| 
|-
| 2019
| "Counting Every Blessing"
| Song of the Year
| 
| 
|-
|-
| 2020
| Sparkle. Pop. Rampage.
| Children's Album of the Year
| 
| 
|}

Notes

References

External links 
 
 Artist page at News Release Tuesday
 Artist page at AllMusic

British Christian rock groups
British folk rock groups
Musical groups established in 2007
Performers of contemporary worship music
Rock music groups from Northern Ireland
Musical groups from County Down